Hossein Khezri (Persian حسین خضری) was an Iranian Kurdish activist who was sentenced to death by the Iranian Islamic Revolutionary Court in 2009. The charge was "waging war against God" through membership in the Party of Free Life of Kurdistan (PJAK). He was arrested in Kermanshah in 2008 and was held at the prison of Urmia.

Khezri was an unmarried atheist and had dropped out of school at eighth grade to support his family. He worked at a carpet weaving store. Unsanitary conditions led to him losing 70% of his eyesight.

He was executed on 15 January 2011 at Oroumieh, West Azarbaijan, Iran. His family as well as his lawyer were not informed of his execution until after the sentence was carried out.

References

1983 births
2011 deaths
Iranian Kurdish people
Executed Iranian people
Executed Kurdish people
Iranian torture victims
Iranian activists
Iranian atheists

People executed by Iran by hanging